Melanie Eileen Thomas (born August 26, 1985 in Cincinnati, Ohio) is an American basketball player who played for the University of Connecticut Huskies from 2004–2008.

High school
Thomas won many awards during her high school basketball career for Cincinnati’s Mount Notre Dame High School.  As a junior, she averaged 18.3 points, 5.2 assists and 3.7 rebounds while leading Mount Notre Dame to a 23–3 mark and a regional finals appearance. As a senior, she led the Cougars to a perfect 28-0 record and a Division I Ohio State Championship. She averaged 20.4 points 5.4 assists and 4.0 rebounds, and made several All America teams. Thomas was named a WBCA All-American, and participated in the 2004 WBCA High School All-America Game.

College

Thomas chose UConn over schools like Duke, Ohio State, and Cincinnati. Thomas struggled during her freshman season.  In her sophomore season, she was named the BIG EAST’s Most Improved Player.  She started the Huskies' first 28 contests before sitting out the final two games of the regular season with a sprained right ankle, suffered during the Syracuse game on February 2, 2006. The next season (junior) was her breakout season.  Thomas started in all 36 games as the Huskies' shooting guard and tallied double-figure points in 16 games, including three 20-plus scoring efforts. She made at least one 3-pointer in 35 of 36 games.  In her junior and senior seasons, she co-captained the team with Renee Montgomery.  She spent the summer prior to the start of her junior season playing for the USA Pan American Games Team, which became the first U.S. squad to capture the gold medal at the Pan American Games since 1987.

In her senior season, Thomas scored her 1,000th career point against the Virginia Cavaliers on December 5, 2007, in a 75-45 UConn win.  Nine games later, her season was cut short due to an ACL injury suffered against Syracuse on January 15, 2008. On January 21, 2008, against the University of North Carolina Tar Heels, Thomas was honored with her 1,000th point ball in front of a sold-out crowd at Gampel Pavilion. While sidelined with the injury during her senior year she wrote in a diary every day, which was later published as a book titled Heart Of A Husky.  She finished her UConn career with 1,098 points, and is in the school's Top 5 in total 3pt FG's made with 224.

Pro career
Thomas was hoping to be a second-round pick in the 2008 WNBA Draft, but went undrafted due to an ACL injury.  In October 2008, Thomas made it back to the court to play in her first professional basketball game for the Irish League's Waterford Wildcats, scoring 33 points in her first game. Thomas played for the Waterford Wildcats for one season (2008–09). The Seattle Storm of the WNBA added her to their training camp roster in March 2009. During the 2009–10 season she played for Artego Bydgoszcz in the Polish league PLKK.

Coaching
Thomas joined the Florida Gulf Coast women's basketball staff as the director of operations in 2010. She was a member of head coach Karl Smesko's staff for four seasons. During that time, the Eagles won four straight Atlantic Sun Regular-Season Championships, including two trips to the NCAA Tournament.

Awards
 2003 — Ohio Girls Basketball Magazine Dream Team selection
 2002 — Adidas Top Ten Camp Underclass All-Star
 2002 — Street & Smith All-America Honorable Mention
 2003 — Street & Smith All-America Honorable Mention.
 2003 — USA Today Super 25 choice
 2003 — Nike All-American
 2004 — McDonald’s All-America Team
 2004 — WBCA All-America Team
 2004 — Associated Press Ohio Co-Player of the Year
 2004 — Cincinnati Metro Player of the Year
 2004 — Ohio Ms. Basketball (2004) awarded by Ohio High School Basketball Coaches Association
 2006 — Big East Most Improved Player
 2008 — CoSIDA Women's Basketball Academic All-District I First Team

University of Connecticut statistics

See also
 List of Connecticut women's basketball players with 1000 points

Notes

External links 
 Official site
 WNBA Prospect page

1985 births
Living people
American women's basketball players
American women writers
Basketball players at the 2007 Pan American Games
Basketball players from Cincinnati
McDonald's High School All-Americans
Pan American Games gold medalists for the United States
Pan American Games medalists in basketball
UConn Huskies women's basketball players
Shooting guards
Medalists at the 2007 Pan American Games
United States women's national basketball team players